Rick Wentworth is a British film and TV composer, conductor, orchestrator and arranger.

Composer

His work in film began with composing the score for Withnail and I, directed by Bruce Robinson in 1987, followed by Robinson's second film How To Get Ahead in Advertising. Both were produced by Handmade Films. 
Wentworth's TV credits include the Jonathan Creek (series and specials), four seasons of the ITV drama Ultimate Force for Bentley Productions, Between the Lines and Cracker for which Wentworth received a BAFTA nomination.
He has also written music for many advertising campaigns, including Nissan, Kellogs, American Express, Burger King, American Airlines, Ford and Guinness.

Conducting

In addition to conducting his own work, Wentworth has conducted film scores including Tomb Raider, Charlie and the Chocolate Factory (2005) Hellboy II, Notorious B.I.G., the Oscar-nominated Milk (2008), The Boys Are Back (2009), Alice in Wonderland, Dark Shadows and Frankenweenie (2012).
His string arrangements can be heard on tracks from artists including The Lightning Seeds, Blur, Del Amitri and in 2008/09 Musical Direction for the Rough Trade artistes Belle & Sebastian and Codeine Velvet Club (2009).

Collaborations

His formative work involved assisting the late composer Sir Michael Tippett bring his opera The Ice Break to its premier performance at the Royal Opera House.
Wentworth has a long association with Pink Floyd founding member Roger Waters, and co-produced, orchestrated and conducted the music for his opera, Ça Ira. The opera was recorded in USA and Europe featuring Bryn Terfel, Paul Groves and Ying Huang. It reached No.1 in the American classical chart, and received Platinum sales in Poland. 
He conducted the world premiere of the overture from Ça Ira in 2002, played by the Royal Philharmonic Orchestra at the Royal Albert Hall. He also arranged and conducted a collection of Roger Waters's tracks, fronted by Waters and his band. He has since conducted the world premier performance of the opera in Rome followed by performances in Poland, Kiev and at the Manaus Opera House in the Brazilian Rainforest of the Amazon. Ça Ira opened the opera season at the Theatro Municipal in São Paulo in April 2013. All performances were conducted by Rick to sell-out audiences. In August of the same year he conducted Ça Ira which opened the annual Cultural Festival at the Gotaplatsen in Gothenburg and featured an international cast of singers, Sally Matthews, Bryan Hymel, Owen Gradus and Christian Van Horn including Roger Waters who acted as narrator to an audience of over ten thousand.

Wentworth also orchestrated and conducted the modern opera Giulietta e Romeo in 2007 for European composer Riccardo Cocciante, which had its premiere at the Arena in Verona and has subsequently toured throughout Italy.
Other collaborations include writing and producing songs with George Benson, Patti Austin, Grace Jones and Paul McCartney, who commissioned him to orchestrate and conduct a personal animated film entitled The Light From Within (yet to be released). Wentworth also orchestrate arrangements for McCartney's televised appearance at the Nobel Peace Prize presentations.
He also collaborated with writer David Levin and wrote six songs for his 2009 musical production People, which premiered at the Edinburgh Festival in that year.
Wentworth has served on the panel of judges for the British Academy of Film and Television Awards (BAFTA) and the Royal Television Society Awards (RTS), and is a current serving Board member of the Akram Khan Dance Company.

Credits

Film composer credits

1999
 Monsieur Pett 
1999
 The Dybbuk
1992
 Freddie as F.R.O.7
1989
 How to Get Ahead in Advertising
1987
 Withnail and I

TV composer credits

2014
 Jonathan Creek – The Curse of the Bronze Lamp
 Jonathan Creek – The Sinner and the Sandman
 Jonathan Creek – The Letters of Septimus Noone
2013
 Jonathan Creek – The Clue of the Savant's Thumb
2010
 Jonathan Creek – The Judas Tree (feature-length TV Special) 
2009
 Jonathan Creek – The Grinning Man (feature-length TV Special) 
2007
 Robbie The Reindeer in Close Encounters of the Herd Kind (Comic Relief)
2006
 Ultimate Force (4 Seasons, 21 Episodes from 2002 – 2006)
 The Good Housekeeping Guide
 Dalziel and Pascoe (5 feature-length episodes from 2004 – 2006)
2003/4
 Jonathan Creek (12 one-hour episodes)
2002
 D.I.Y. Hard
 Paradise Heights (6 episodes)
 Little Ghosts (48 episodes)
2000
 The Last Polar Bears
 Blind Ambition
1999
 The Alchemists (6-hour episodes)
1998
 Silent Witness (6-hour episodes)
1997
 Prohibition: Thirteen Years That Changed America (12 Episodes)
 Cracker – White Ghost (Feature Length TV Special)
1996
 Cracker (2 Seasons from 1995–1996)
 The Moonstone
 The Writing On The Wall (4 Feature Length Episodes)
1995
 Rules of Engagement
1993
 Between The Lines (13 hour episodes)
1992
 Sam Saturday (6 hour episodes)
1991
 Sleepers (4 hour episodes)
 White Goods (4 hour episodes)
 Work!

Musical/opera credits

2010
 Bet Your Bottom Dollar 
2009
 People
2007
 Giulietta e Romeo
2004
 Ca Ira

Conductor/Musical Director credits

2014
 Big Eyes
 Roger Waters: The Wall
2013
 Peabody and Sherman
2012
 Hitchcock
 Promised Land
 Dark Shadows
 Frankenweenie
2010
 Alice in Wonderland 
2009
 The Boys Are Back
 Terminator Salvation
 Notorious
 Monsieur Pett
2008
 Milk
 The Duchess
 Hellboy II: The Golden Army
 Journal of a Contract Killer
2005

Orchestrator/arranger credits2014 Roger Waters: The Wall2007 Robbie the Reindeer in Close Encounters of the Herd Kind2005 Goal!2001 Rat Race
 Lara Croft: Tomb Raider2000 Love's Labours Lost1996 All Dogs Go To Heaven 21990 Die Hard 21989 How To Get Ahead in Advertising1988 The Adventures of Baron Münchausen1982'Fourscore'' The Channel 4 Theme (composer  David Dundas)

Notes

External links

Rick Wentworth on Twitter
HotHouse Music

English composers
English conductors (music)
British male conductors (music)
Living people
21st-century British conductors (music)
21st-century British male musicians
Year of birth missing (living people)